Anthony Morwood (born 17 May 1960) is a former Australian rules footballer who played for the Sydney Swans in the Victorian Football League (VFL).

He was usually seen in the half forward flank and it was in that position that he was named in the Swan's 'Team of the Century'.

In 1990, Morwood joined the Hobart Football Club (then captain/coached by former Swan Mark Browning) in the Tasmanian Football League in mid-season as a fly-in player and played in the Tigers 1990 premiership team before retiring days after the grand final. He played for Frankston in the Victorian Football Association in 1993.

Morwood twice topped the goalkicking charts for his club.

References

External links

1960 births
Living people
Sydney Swans players
New South Wales Australian rules football State of Origin players
Hobart Football Club players
Frankston Football Club players
Australian rules footballers from Victoria (Australia)
Victorian State of Origin players